Fachie is a surname. Notable people with the surname include:

 Lora Fachie (born 1988), English racing cyclist
 Neil Fachie (born 1984), British Paralympic athlete

See also
 Fachin (surname)